Lorostemon is a genus of flowering plants belonging to the family Clusiaceae.

Its native range is Southern Tropical America.

Species:

Lorostemon bombaciflorus 
Lorostemon coelhoi 
Lorostemon colombianus 
Lorostemon negrensis 
Lorostemon stipitatus

References

Clusiaceae
Malpighiales genera
Taxa named by Adolpho Ducke